Carlos Armando Vásquez Carvajal (born December 19, 1982) is a Venezuelan taekwondo practitioner. He won the bronze medal for the 72 kg class at the 2005 World Taekwondo Championships in Madrid, Spain, and silver for the 80 kg class at the 2011 Pan American Games in Guadalajara, Mexico.

Vasquez qualified for the men's 80 kg class at the 2008 Summer Olympics in Beijing, after placing third from the Pan American Qualification Tournament in Cali, Colombia. He defeated Gabon's Lionel Baguissi by a unanimous decision in the preliminary round, before losing out his next match to Great Britain's Aaron Cook, with a final score of 2–5.

References

External links

NBC 2008 Olympics profile

Venezuelan male taekwondo practitioners
1982 births
Living people
Olympic taekwondo practitioners of Venezuela
Taekwondo practitioners at the 2008 Summer Olympics
Taekwondo practitioners at the 2011 Pan American Games
Pan American Games silver medalists for Venezuela
Pan American Games medalists in taekwondo
World Taekwondo Championships medalists
Medalists at the 2011 Pan American Games
20th-century Venezuelan people
21st-century Venezuelan people